Mansfield Armory, is a historic National Guard armory located in Mansfield, Pennsylvania, in Tioga County. It was built in 1938-1939 for the 108th Ambulance Company, 103rd Medical Regiment of the Pennsylvania National Guard. The utilitarian brick,  building has a center drill hall rising above the surrounding one story section.

It was listed on the National Register of Historic Places in 1991.

See also 
 National Register of Historic Places listings in Tioga County, Pennsylvania

References 

Buildings and structures in Tioga County, Pennsylvania
Armories on the National Register of Historic Places in Pennsylvania
Pennsylvania National Guard
Government buildings completed in 1939
National Register of Historic Places in Tioga County, Pennsylvania